is a Japanese long-distance runner competing primarily in the 5000 metres. She represented her country at the 2013 and 2015 World Championships in Athletics reaching the final on the second occasion.

International competitions

Personal bests
Outdoor
1500 metres – 4:17.78 (Oita 2006)
3000 metres – 9:05.45 (Kitami 2014)
5000 metres – 15:16.82 (Palo Alto 2015)
20 kilometres – 1:07:35 (Marugame 2013)
Half marathon – 1:11:16 (Marugame 2013)

References

External links
 

1985 births
Living people
People from Ise, Mie
Japanese female long-distance runners
Olympic female long-distance runners
Olympic athletes of Japan
World Athletics Championships athletes for Japan
Athletes (track and field) at the 2016 Summer Olympics
Asian Games competitors for Japan
Athletes (track and field) at the 2014 Asian Games
Japan Championships in Athletics winners
20th-century Japanese women
21st-century Japanese women